Fore! is a 1982 video game published by Automated Simulations.

Gameplay
Fore! is a golf game which includes a driving range for players to use for practice, an 18 hole course for anyone to use, and a longer more challenging 18 hole course for the championship.

Reception
Stanley Greenlaw reviewed the game for Computer Gaming World, and stated that "The main skill involved in the game is selecting the correct club and swing strength for your shot. The shot will fall more or less in the area in which you aim. Wind direction, which only changes after the first nine, can affect the flight of the ball."

References

External links
1984 Software Encyclopedia from Electronic Games
Review in Softalk

1982 video games
Apple II games
Apple II-only games
Epyx games
Golf video games
Video games developed in the United States